"Bagagedrager" (English: "Luggage Carrier" or "Rack") is a song recorded by Dutch rappers Gers Pardoel and Sef (Yousef Gnaoui) for Pardoel's debut studio album, Deze wereld is van jou. It was released on 20 January 2012 through TopNotch, as the third single of the album. The song was co-written by Pardoel and Gnaoui and was produced by Pardoel.

Track listing
Digital download
"Bagagedrager" – 3:41
"Bagagedrager" (Instrumental Version) - 3:44

Personnel
Songwriting – Gerwin Pardoel, Yousef Gnaoui
Production – Gers Pardoel

Source:

Charts and certifications

Weekly charts

Year-end charts

Certifications

Release history

References

2011 songs
2011 singles